The chapters of Negima! Magister Negi Magi are written and illustrated by Ken Akamatsu, the same person who wrote and illustrated the immensely popular series A.I. Love You and Love Hina. The series is being serialized in Japan in Weekly Shōnen Magazine and is being collected into bound novels by Kodansha. It has been licensed for an English-language release in the United States and Canada by Del Rey Manga, and in the United Kingdom by Tanoshimi.

The series was adapted into a 26-episode-long anime television series by the Japanese animation studio Xebec and originally aired on TV Tokyo. It has been licensed for an English release in the United States by Funimation Entertainment, and has aired on the Funimation Channel. In addition, four original video animations (OVAs) have been made, as well as a TV drama series.

Oricon Charts

For the week of November 25, 2008, Volume 24 sold 176,984 copies and peaked at #2.

For the week of February 23, 2009, Volume 25 sold 179,903 copies and peaked at #2.

For the week of May 27, 2009, Volume 26 sold 112,824 copies and peaked at #2.

For the week of September 20, 2009, Volume 27 sold 149,143 copies and peaked at #4.

For the week of November 29, 2009, Volume 28 sold 200,481 copies and peaked at #18.

For the week of February 21, 2010, Volume 29 sold 148,228 copies and peaked at #3.

For the week of May 23, 2010, Volume 30 sold 165,334 copies and peaked at #4.

For the week of August 22, 2010, Volume 31 sold 166,332 copies and peaked at #6.

For the week of November 29, 2010, Volume 32 sold 147,515 copies and peaked at #3.

For the week of February 28, 2011, Volume 33 sold 129,019 copies and peaked at #5.

For the week of May 22, 2011, Volume 34 sold 148,762 copies and peaked at #2.

For the week of August 29, 2011, Volume 35 sold 135,505 copies and peaked at #4.

For the week of November 28, 2011, Volume 36 sold 117,007 copies and peaked at #4.

For the week of February 26, 2012, Volume 37 sold 154,767 copies and peaked at #11.

For the week of May 27, 2012, Volume 38 sold 209,199 copies and peaked at #12.

In 2011, it became the 40th top selling manga with sales of 1,103,573 copies (in that year alone).

As of 2013, the series has sold a combined total of almost 20 million copies, ranking it among the best selling manga of all time in the world.

Chapter list

See also
List of Negima! Magister Negi Magi characters
List of Negima! Magister Negi Magi episodes

References

External links
 
 

Chapters
Negima! Magister Negi Magi